Peter Joseph Rodrigues (born 21 January 1944) is a retired footballer. He was the captain of Southampton's 1976 FA Cup-winning team.

Cardiff City

Rodrigues was born in Cardiff, Wales, and originally turned out for his local schools. He went on to be selected for both Cardiff Schoolboys and for Welsh schoolboys, before signing for Cardiff City as a professional in May 1961. Rodrigues almost left the side before ever making a professional appearance for the club when Newport County offered £500 to take him to Somerton Park, but the offer was turned down by Cardiff. He went on to make his debut in a 3–3 draw with Southampton in September 1963, and for the next three seasons he was virtually ever-present in the side. But Rodrigues was unhappy with the standard of football at the club and decided to leave.

Leicester City and Sheffield Wednesday

Rodrigues was signed by Leicester City in December 1965, to fill the right back position, moving John Sjoberg into the centre of the field. He was an established Welsh international when he arrived at City for a club record fee of £42,500. Rodrigues' attacking full back play set a standard to City's play in the next decade and when Steve Whitworth replaced Rodrigues he played with the same passion to go forward. Rodrigues was a fine over-lapping full-back who was renowned for his sliding tackles.

Rodrigues made 139 league appearances for Leicester scoring 6 goals, plus a further 29 cup appearances including City's losing 1969 FA Cup final, before leaving to join Sheffield Wednesday in October 1970.

Southampton

Rodrigues was signed on a free transfer by Southampton at the age of 30 in 1975, after being released from his contract by Sheffield Wednesday. The Welsh international full-back was signed by Lawrie McMenemy as cover for Steve Mills, who had been injured in a car crash and was out of action for a lengthy period of time. Rodrigues' first season at The Dell could not have been better, with the side winning their first and only FA Cup. Rodrigues played at right-back in the Wembley final, and captained the team, as Southampton beat Manchester United 1–0. However, Rodrigues' second year at The Dell saw his playing days ended with a persistent knee injury.

He made 59 league appearances for Saints scoring 3 goals, plus a further 13 cup and other appearances.

Retirement

After retirement from football, Rodrigues became the landlord of the King Rufus pub in Eling. In 1987, Rodrigues moved back to Wales to take over another pub and set up a soccer school in Tenby.

He later returned to Southampton to manage the Conservative Club, where he stayed for 8 years until the death of his wife, Lin. In 2002, Rodrigues moved to Alicante in Spain for a few years, but after remarrying (to Kate) he settled back in Southampton, where he worked as a driver.

In October 2004, Rodrigues' eldest daughter placed his FA Cup winner's medal up for auction without his knowledge. The medal sold for £10,200 and was initially said to have been purchased by a mystery bidder, but it was subsequently announced that the medal had been purchased by Southampton Football Club.

Honours

As a  player
Leicester City
 FA Cup finalist 1969

Southampton
 FA Cup winner 1976

References

For the full story of the medal auction see 

1944 births
Living people
Footballers from Cardiff
Welsh footballers
Wales international footballers
Wales under-23 international footballers
Cardiff City F.C. players
Leicester City F.C. players
Sheffield Wednesday F.C. players
Southampton F.C. players
English Football League players
Association football fullbacks
FA Cup Final players